Jérôme Mombris Razanapiera  (born 27 November 1987) is a professional footballer who plays as a defender for Gazélec Ajaccio. Born in France, he represented Madagascar at international level.

Club career
On 19 August 2021, he signed a two-year contract with Guingamp. He announced his retirement on 3 January 2022 due to "personal reasons". He later reverted on his decision and went on to sign for local Reunion club JS Saint-Pierroise. After a short stint there, et made a return to corsica and signed for Gazélec Ajaccio for a second time, in French fifth division, after the club suffered multiple relegations.

International career
Mombris was born in France to a Reunionnais father, and is of Malagasy descent through his grandfather. He made his debut for the Madagascar national football team in a friendly 1–1 tie with Comoros on 11 November 2017.
He played at 2019 Africa Cup of Nations when Madagascar made a sensational advance to the quarterfinals.

Career statistics

International

References

External links

 
 

1987 births
Living people
Sportspeople from Saint-Brieuc
Association football defenders
People with acquired Malagasy citizenship
Malagasy footballers
Madagascar international footballers
French footballers
French sportspeople of Malagasy descent
Malagasy people of French descent
French people of Réunionnais descent
Stade Plabennécois players
US Avranches players
Le Havre AC players
Gazélec Ajaccio players
Grenoble Foot 38 players
En Avant Guingamp players
Ligue 2 players
Championnat National players
Footballers from Brittany
Black French sportspeople
2019 Africa Cup of Nations players